The Albanians in Slovenia constitute an ethnic minority of the country as immigrants. Most Albanians in Slovenia originally come from Kosovo, Macedonia and Montenegro.

History
The first Albanians located in the territories of today's Slovenia came after the fall of the Ottoman Empire and after the Balkan wars.

At the time of Yugoslavia, Albanians migrated to Slovenia for economic and political reasons, especially after 1945. Albanian migrants were mainly from the Republic of Macedonia, Kosovo and Montenegro.

Even in the republic of Slovenia, as in most countries, we have an early exile of Albanians, especially from the areas of Kosovo. Here the Albanians are present almost immediately, sometime after the Second World War, namely from the time of the creation of the Yugoslav state, in which the state was part of a constituent unit, Slovenia as a republic and the state of Kosovo as an autonomous province.

Since then, the difficult economic situation and later, even politics, forced Albanians to seek and find better living conditions in this country, which from the outset was distinguished by the standard of living compared to other units of the former Yugoslav federation.

Demographics

At the beginning, we had a small number of wing workers in Slovenia, but the worse worsening of the political situation in Kosovo caused the number of Albanians there to grow, whereas today, according to statistical data, in Slovene the number of Albanians is 6.228 which was issued on the basis of 0.31% of Albanians from the total number of inhabitants in Slovenia. Today there are around 10,000 Albanians living in Slovenia.

Notable People

Sports
 Erjon Kastrati  -  Slovene-Albanian professional basketball player
 Rok Stipčević  -  Basketball player
 Gëzim Morina  -  Slovene-Albanian professional basketball player who plays for Primorska of the Telemach League
 Liridon Osmanaj  - Slovenian footballer 
 Gzim Rexhaj  - Slovenian footballer 
 Albin Tahiri  - Kosovo Albanian World Cup alpine ski racer 
 Leutrim Osaj  -  Slovenian footballer
 Egzon Kryeziu  -  Slovenian footballer
 Altin Kryeziu  -  Slovenian footballer
 Luana Zajmi  -  Slovenian-Albanian footballer

References

Slovenia
Muslim communities in Europe
Slovenian people of Albanian descent